The Japan Open is an annual badminton tournament held in Japan. It became part of the BWF Super Series tournaments in 2007. BWF categorised Japan Open as one of the five BWF World Tour Super 750 events in the BWF events structure since 2018.

Host cities
 1982: Kobe
 1983: Yokohama
 1984–1985, 1987: Gunma
 1986, 2022: Osaka
 1989–2019: Tokyo

Past winners

Performances by nation

References

External links
 Website of the Yonex Open
 Japan Open results history from the tournament website (in Japanese)
 Handbook of the 1987 Yonex Cup Japan Open Badminton Championships

 
Badminton tournaments in Japan